Minix-vmd is a computer operating system which was created from MINIX 2.0, a Unix-like microkernel, and added some features such as virtual memory and X Window System support. It is free and open source software.

Minix-vmd runs on IA-32 and compatible microprocessor architectures. It was written by many of the same authors who develop MINIX, at the Vrije Universiteit (VU) in Amsterdam. The acronym reputedly stands for VU Minix Distribution.

According to its authors, Minix-vmd was created to meet specific needs they had, rather than to be a general purpose use OS like Linux. It also does not share the educational goals of MINIX.

Nevertheless, the OS may have been of interest to others for various purposes, due to its small resource use compared with other operating systems, and other factors. However, MINIX 3 incorporated Minix-vmd's functions.

See also

MINIX
MINIX file system

References

External links
 
 Minix-vmd

Discontinued operating systems
Microkernels
MINIX
Unix variants